In Ancient Greece, a deme or  (plural: demoi, δημοι) was a suburb or a subdivision of Athens and other city-states. Demes as simple subdivisions of land in the countryside seem to have existed in the 6th century BC and earlier, but did not acquire particular significance until the reforms of Cleisthenes in 508 BC.  In those reforms, enrollment in the citizen-lists of a deme became the requirement for citizenship; prior to that time, citizenship had been based on membership in a phratry, or family group. At this same time, demes were established in the main city of Athens itself, where they had not previously existed; in all, at the end of Cleisthenes' reforms, Athens was divided into 139 demes to which one can be added Berenikidai (established in 224/223 BC), Apollonieis (201/200 BC), and Antinoeis (added in 126/127). The establishment of demes as the fundamental units of the state weakened the gene, or aristocratic family groups, that had dominated the phratries.

A deme functioned to some degree as a polis in miniature, and indeed some demes, such as Eleusis and Acharnae, were in fact significant towns. Each deme had a demarchos who supervised its affairs; various other civil, religious, and military functionaries existed in various demes. Demes held their own religious festivals and collected and spent revenue.

Demes were combined within the same area to make trittyes, larger population groups, which in turn were combined to form the ten tribes, or phylai of Athens. Each tribe contained one trittys from each of three regions: the city, the coast, and the inland area.

Cleisthenes' reforms and its modifications

First period: 508 – 307/306 BC

Cleisthenes divided the landscape in three zones—urban (asty), coastal (paralia) and inland (mesogeia)—and the 139 demes were organized into 30 groups called trittyes ("thirds"), ten for each of the zones and into ten tribes, or phylai, each composed of three trittyes, one from the coast, one from the city, and one from the inland area.

Cleisthenes also reorganized the Boule, created with 400 members under Solon, so that it had 500 members, 50 from each tribe, each deme having a fixed quota.

The ten tribes were named after legendary heroes and came to have an official order:

Second period: 307/306 – 224/223 BC
In 307/306 – 224/223 BC the system was reorganized with the creation of two Macedonian Phylai (XI. Antigonis and XII. Demetrias), named after Demetrius I of Macedon and Antigonus I Monophthalmus, and an increase in the membership of the Boule to 600. Each of the ten tribes, except Aiantis, provided three demes (not necessarily one for trittyes); the missing contribution of Aiantis was covered by two demes of Leontis and one from Aigeis.

Third period: 224/223 – 201/200 BC
The Egyptian Phyle XIII. Ptolemais, named after Ptolemy III Euergetes was created in 224/223 BC and the Boule was again increased to 650 members, the twelve tribes giving each a demos. A new village was created and named Berenikidai after Ptolemy's wife Berenice II of Egypt.

Fourth period: 201/200 BC – 126/127 AD
In 201/200 BC the Macedonian Phylae were dissolved and the villages (except the two given to Ptolemais) went back to their original tribes. In the spring of 200 BC Tribe XIV. Attalis, named after Attalus I, was created following the same scheme used for the creation of the Egyptian Phyle: each tribe contributed a deme and a new deme, Apollonieis, was created in honour of Apollonis, wife of Attalus I of Pergamum. As a consequence there were again 12 tribes and 600 members of the Boule. From this period onward, quotas were no longer assigned to the demes for the 50 Boule members from each tribe

Fifth period: 126/127 – third century
The last modification was the creation in 126/127 of XV. Hadrianis, named after the Emperor Hadrian, following the same scheme: each tribe contributed a deme and a new deme, Antinoeis, was created in honour of Hadrian's favourite, Antinous. Each tribe contributed 40 members to the Boule.

Representation in the Boule

In the first three periods there it a more detailed system of fixed quotas which essentially remained unchanged. There is no evidence for a single general reapportionment of quotas within each of the first three periods, while there are evident small quota-variations between the first and the second periods.

More precisely in:
307/306 BC, 24 demes increased of 1 bouleutes, 13 of 2, 5 or 3, 6 of 4 and 1 (Lower Paiania) of 11 and there is not a single example of a decreased quota.
224/223 BC 4 demes increased of 1 bouletes

As regards the last two periods, the material illustrates the complete collapse of the quota-system from 201/200 BC.

Spurious and Late Roman demes
Some deme lists suggest extensions to the list of 139+3 Demes by adding 43 additional names, some of which have been considered by scholars as Attic demes. The criticism performed by John S. Traill shows that 24 are the result of error, ancient or modern, or of misinterpretation and 19 are well known chiefly from inscriptions of the second and third centuries AD, i.e. in the fifth period, and thus for political purposes they were originally dependent on legitimate Cleisthenic demes.

Homonymous and divided demes
There were six pairs of homonymous demes:
Halai Araphenides (VII.Kekropis) and Halai Aixonides (II.Aigeis)
Oion Dekeleikon (VIII.Hippothontis; later XIII.Ptolemais, XIV.Attalis) and Oion Kerameikon (IV.Leontis; affiliated with XII.Demetrias in the Macedonian period)
Eitea: there were two demes of that name, but no modifier is known. One is associated to V.Acamantis, later XI.Antigonis and XV.Hadrianis; the other is associated to X.Antiochis
Oinoe and Oinoe: again no modifier is known; one deme was associated to VIII.Hippothontis, later XII.Demetrias and XIII.Ptolemais; the other was associated to IX.Aiantis, later XIV.Attalis and XV.Hadrianis.
Kolonai: again no modifier is known; one deme was associated to IV.Leontis; the other to X.Antiochis, later XI.Antigonis and XIII.Ptolemais.
Eroiadai: again no modifier is known for these two demes associated to VIII.Hippothontis and X.Antiochis.

There were six divided demes, one composed of three parts:
Agryle, Upper Agryle and Lower Agryle (I.Erechtheis); one of them, but there is no prosopographical information for identifying which, was transferred to XI.Antigonis and went back at the end of the Macedonian period; later one of them (again it is uncertain which) was transferred to XIV.Attalis.
Lamptrai, Upper Lamptrai and Coastal/Lower Lamptrai (I.Erechtheis); Upper Lamptrai was transferred to XI.Antigonis and went back at the end of the Macedonian period.
Pergase, Upper and Lower (I.Erechtheis); one of them (no prosopographical information allows to decide which) was transferred to XI.Antigonis and went back at the end of the Macedonian period.
Ankyle: no special designations of either section are preserved, although they are presumed to have the regular Upper and Lower forms. One section, perhaps Upper Ankale, was transferred to XI.Antigonis and went back at the end of the Macedonian period.
Paiania, Upper Paiania and Lower Paiania (III.Pandionis); Upper Paiania, was transferred to XI.Antigonis and went back at the end of the Macedonian period.
Potamos has three sections, Upper Potamos, Lower Potamos and Potamos Deiradiotes (IV.Leontes); during the Macedonian period, Potamos Deiradiotes belonged to XI.Antigonis and Lower Potamos to XII.Demetrias

List of Athenian demes according to tribes/phylai (φυλαί)

The ten Cleisthenic tribes

The Macedonian tribes

The later tribes

The ten tribes of Thurii
When the city was settled under the support of Pericles and the command of Lampon and Xenocritus the population was organized in ten tribes, following the Athenian organization: there were tribes for the population of  1. Arcadia, 2. Achaea, 3. Elis, 4. Boeotia, 5. Delphi, 6. Dorians, 7. Ionians, 8. population of Euboea, 9. the islands and 10. Athenians.

Later usage 

The term "deme" survived into the Hellenistic and Roman eras. By the time of the Byzantine Empire, the term was used to refer to one of the four chariot racing factions, the Reds, the Blues, the Greens and the Whites.

In modern Greece, the term  is used to denote one of the municipalities.

Footnotes

References 

Fine, John V. A. The Ancient Greeks: A critical history (Harvard University Press, 1983). .
Hornblower, Simon, and Anthony Spawforth, ed., The Oxford Classical Dictionary (Oxford University Press, 2003). .
Meritt, B. D. The Athenian Year. Berkeley, 1961.
Suzanne, Bernard (1998).  plato-dialogues.org, "Attic Tribes and Demes". Retrieved August 1, 2006.
Whitehead, David. The Demes of Attica 508/7–ca. 250 BC: A Political and Social Study (Princeton University Press, 1986).

 
 
Ancient Athens
Ancient Greek government